The Pivabiska River is a river in Cochrane District in Northeastern Ontario, Canada. It is in the James Bay drainage basin and is a left tributary of Missinaibi River.

The river begins at Lac Pivabiska in geographic Casgrain Township and heads north. It turns northeast, then east, enters geographic Garden Township and immediately thereafter reaches its mouth at the Missinaibi River. The Missinaibi River flows via the Moose River to James Bay.

Tributaries
Casgrain Creek (right)
Lac Pivabiska
Valentine River
Pivabiska Narrows
Lac Ste. Thérèse
Ste.-Thérèse Creek

References

Sources

Rivers of Cochrane District